Sultan Ali Shah ibni Almarhum Sultan Sulaiman Badrul Alam Shah (24 January 1914 – 17 May 1996) was the fifteenth Sultan of Terengganu. He was the son of the fourteenth Sultan, Sultan Sulaiman Badrul Alam Shah and the legitimate heir to the throne of Terengganu.

Sultan Sulaiman died on 25 September 1942 of blood poisoning. The Japanese Military Administration, which at that time occupied Malaya, proclaimed Sultan Ali as the Sultan of Terengganu.

On 18 October 1943, the Thai government under Prime Minister Field Marshal Plaek Pibulsonggram took over the administration of Terengganu from the Japanese and continued to recognize Sultan Ali as the legitimate Sultan.

When the British returned after the end of World War II, they declined to recognize Sultan Ali. Allegedly, Sultan Ali was too much in debt and had been too close to the Japanese during their occupation. According to Sultan Ali, the British Military Administration wanted him removed for his refusal to sign the Malayan Union treaty.

The British Military Administration also disapproved of Sultan Ali's character, where he was said to have repudiated his official consort Tengku Putri Hajjah ‘Ain ul-Jamal, Tengku Sri Nila Utama of Pahang (the daughter of Sultan Abu Bakar of Pahang) and had contracted an unsuitable second marriage to a former prostitute.

On 5 November 1945 the Terengganu State Council, of which consisted thirteen members, announced the dismissal of Sultan Ali and the appointment of Tengku Ismail as the sixteenth Sultan of Terengganu. Tengku Ismail became known as Sultan Ismail Nasiruddin Shah and was installed on 6 June 1949 at Istana Maziah, Kuala Terengganu. Sultan Ismail's descendants have since ruled Terengganu.

Sultan Ali continued to dispute his dismissal until his death on 17 May 1996.

References

Ali Shah
Malayan collaborators with Imperial Japan
1914 births
1996 deaths
Monarchs who abdicated
Malaysian people of Malay descent
Malaysian Muslims
Ali Shah
20th-century Malaysian politicians